This is a list of the mayors of the City of Bayside, a local government area in Victoria, Australia. The City of Bayside was formed in 1994.

Commissioners (1994–1997)

Mayors and Deputy Mayors (1997 to present)

See also
 City of Bayside
 List of Town Halls in Melbourne
 Local government areas of Victoria

External links
Bayside City Council

References
Bayside History

Bayside
Mayors Bayside
City of Bayside